Michael Gilbert was an English solicitor and crime-fiction author.

Michael Gilbert may also refer to:
 Michael Gilbert (goldsmith) (died 1590), Scottish jeweller and financier
 Michael T. Gilbert, American comic book artist and writer
 Michael William Gilbert, American music composer
 Michael Gilbert, victim of 2009 murder
 Michael Gilbert (artist), American fan artist

See also
 Mike Gilbert, sports agent
 Mike Gilbert (rugby), New Zealand rugby union and rugby league player